Granata is an Italian word for “grenade”.

People
 Daniele Granata (born 1991), Italian footballer
 Giovanni Battista Granata (c.1620–1687), Italian guitarist and composer
 Graziella Granata (born 1941), Italian film and stage actress
 Kevin Granata (1961–2007), American biomedical engineer
 Peter C. Granata (1898–1973), U.S. Representative from Illinois
 Rocco Granata (born 1938), Belgian singer, songwriter, and accordionist
 Roy Granata (1922–2005), Argentinian jazz musician

Other
The Russian word Granata can mean either Grenade or Pomegranate.
 Stielhandgranate, a German "stick hand grenade"
 Granata (gastropod), a genus of sea snails in the family Chilodontidae
 I Granata, a nickname of Torino F.C., an Italian professional football club

Italian-language surnames
Occupational surnames